Tyler Ludwig (born May 24, 1985) is an American former professional ice hockey defenseman. He last played with the Allen Americans of the ECHL having won three consecutive titles with the club in the Central Hockey League and the ECHL.

Personal information
Tyler and his twin brother, Trevor, were teammates on the Americans. Their father, Craig Ludwig, played 17 seasons in the National Hockey League
, with his last six playing for the Dallas Stars.

Career statistics

Awards and honors

References

External links

1985 births
Allen Americans players
American men's ice hockey defensemen
Houston Aeros (1994–2013) players
Ice hockey people from Texas
Idaho Steelheads (ECHL) players
Living people
San Antonio Rampage players
Texas Stars players
Western Michigan Broncos men's ice hockey players